Stanley Bank Meadow is a  Site of Special Scientific Interest situated 2.8km north-east of St Helens. The site was notified in 1988 due to its biological features which is predominantly damp unimproved neutral grassland, which is a rare habitat in Merseyside. It is also part of a larger area which is a Local Nature Reserve called Stanley Bank.

References

Sites of Special Scientific Interest in Merseyside
Local Nature Reserves in Merseyside
Meadows in Merseyside